Charles James Parsons  (July 18, 1863 – March 24, 1936) was a Major League Baseball pitcher for the Boston Beaneaters, New York Metropolitans and Cleveland Spiders. He also played for a number of minor league teams between 1884 and 1889. On May 29, 1885, he pitched the first no hitter for the Birmingham Barons of Alabama in the Southern League.

References

*Information from Allen Barra's book "Rickwood Field - A century in America's Oldest Ballpark"

1863 births
1936 deaths
19th-century baseball players
Major League Baseball pitchers
Baseball players from Pennsylvania
Boston Beaneaters players
New York Metropolitans players
Cleveland Spiders players
Newark Domestics players
Oswego Sweegs players
Rochester Flour Cities players
Rochester Maroons players
Jackson Jaxons players
Minneapolis Millers (baseball) players
Oneida Indians players
People from Tioga County, Pennsylvania